Saleen Special Vehicles or SSV, was a Saleen-owned and Saleen-operated small-volume, specialty vehicle assembly plant located at 1225 East Maple Road in Troy, Michigan.  The building housing this facility was previously a Stanley door-manufacturing facility prior to renovations performed by Saleen to manufacture the Ford GT (which occurred between 2003 and 2006).  Prior to use by Stanley, the building was the headquarters of the AMT Corporation, known by many as the premier manufacturer of 1:25th scale model cars in the 1950s, 1960s and 1970s.  The plant was last used principally for production of the Saleen S331 Sport Truck, and various models of Saleen Mustangs.  Additionally, following Steve Saleen's departure from the company, the core of Saleen's exterior styling and engineering was relocated to Saleen, Troy.

Manufacturing Facilities
SSV boasts a single assembly line outfitted to accommodate mixed-product production, a high-efficiency paint shop capable of high-bake paint cure processes, fabrication shop, and specialty car assembly area.  Saleen also conducted painting operations for the Dodge Viper in the paint shop at Saleen Special Vehicles.  Based upon the production rates achieved during the manufacture of the Ford GT, Saleen Special Vehicles is capable of producing as many as 15 complete vehicles per day.

Show-Car Facilities
SSV houses a multitude of specialty facilities configured with a focus upon the creation of vehicles for use in motion pictures and auto shows.  SSV offered prototype model and assembly services to other automotive OEM companies.

Trivia
The cars used in the movie Transformers were built at SSV
A quote considered "infamous" at SSV from Steve Saleen reading: "Anybody can build cars from parts.  Only you can build cars with no parts" appears on a multitude of small signs hung throughout the plant.

External links
 Official Site

Saleen Special Vehicles